Liza Colby is a fictional character on the American soap opera, All My Children, portrayed by actress Jamie Luner from April 2009 until September 2011. She was previously played by actress Marcy Walker from 1981–1984, and then again from 1995–2005, although the role was also briefly portrayed by Alice Haining from September 1984 to 1985. Liza is a resident of the fictional town of Pine Valley, Pennsylvania.

Storylines
Liza made her first appearance in 1981 as a snobbish upper-class teenager from one of Pine Valley's wealthiest families, with a crush on upper-class classmate Greg Nelson. However, Greg's heart belonged to Jenny Gardner, a warm-hearted working-class girl. Liza engaged in numerous schemes to steal Greg from Jenny.  Her two most heinous acts as a teenager occurred at about the same time.  Liza blackmailed Jenny, threatening to reveal to Greg that Jenny's father, Ray Gardner was a convict who had raped Ruth Martin years earlier. After Jenny's best friend Jesse Hubbard confronted her, Liza falsely accused him of attempted rape, subtly using old stereotypes about black men and White women as a means of making her story seem credible. With Jenny humiliated and Jesse eager to avoid arrest, the two fled to the Hell's Kitchen section of New York City, where they remained for weeks until Liza's accusations against Jesse were discredited.

After Liza failed in her schemes to win Greg and she realized that he would never love her (He was already turned off by her narcissistic and snobby personality from the get go.), she started a relationship with Ruth's adopted son Tad Martin (Jenny's biological brother). However, Liza was crushed when she discovered Tad was also having an affair with her mother, Marian Chandler. Later, partly as a result of her "easy" reputation, Liza was raped. Initially, no one believed her due to her past history as a lying blackmailer except Dr. Cliff Warner. However, she mistook his compassion for romantic interest and attempted to steal him from his wife Nina. Liza left town a few months later to give herself a fresh start in a new city.

Liza made a triumphant return to Pine Valley in September 1995. Now a strong career woman, Liza got revenge on Tad by seducing him into bed, breaking up his marriage to Dixie Cooney, even going so far as to making a tape recording of the two of them discussing the incident. However, Liza had a change of heart over what she had done and destroyed the tape. But unbeknownst to her, Marian had made a duplicate of it and played it over the loudspeaker's at Adam's television station, WRCW. Tad, Adam and Liza attempted to stop her, but Dixie, who was present at the station, overheard everything and left Pine Valley, divorcing Tad shortly afterward. Liza felt terrible guilt over the incident and this marked a major change in her personality, leading her to eventually become a kinder and warmer person. Liza then moved on to Jake Martin, Tad's adopted brother. Liza then found herself in a strange predicament when she got pregnant with what she thought was Jake's baby. It turned out to be Adam Chandler's child, for he had bought the fertility clinic Liza had chosen and switched Jake's sperm with his. In May 1999, Liza gave birth to her daughter, Colby Marian Chandler, and eventually fell for Adam and married him. However, Adam's controlling nature and penchant for lying led to their divorce, remarrying and divorce.

Liza got the shock of her life in 2001, when Mia Saunders revealed herself to be her half-sister. Eventually, Liza and Mia formed a sisterly bond and Liza even financed the money to upstart Fusion, the new cosmetics company that Mia co-founded in late 2002 with Greenlee Smythe, Kendall Hart, and Simone Torres. She also became a co-founder of Fusion and devoted a great deal of her time helping the company get established in the cosmetics industry. In late 2004, Liza, with Tad's help, went on the run with Colby in tow. Her last appearance was in early 2005. However, Colby eventually returned (rapidly aged to her teenaged years) to Pine Valley to live with Adam. Initially, she has exhibited all of Liza's worst character traits from the '80s, including consistent spoiled behavior, and a false statutory rape allegation against Erica Kane's son Josh Madden. However, Colby has put most of such behavior behind her, and has recently emerged as a more sympathetic character.

Liza, now being played by Jamie Luner, returned to Pine Valley in April 2009. She has "reinvented herself" as an attorney and comes back to reclaim daughter Colby. She has made a deal with Jake Martin to adopt Amanda Dillon's son as her own, naming him Stuart after her late step-father. Strangely enough, Liza's history as the financial founder of Fusion or any of her other ties to the company have not been mentioned since Jamie Luner assumed the role.

During the week of Stuart's murder mystery (May 2009), it is revealed that Liza is six months pregnant. Liza admits to Zach Slater that she is not pregnant, but that she is expecting a child through a surrogate. She does not want anyone to know that she is not really pregnant, and asks Zach to keep her secret. While talking to Amanda and she seems she plans on adopting Amanda's baby boy and not tell anyone about it with the help of Jake Martin. Jake plans to help Liza, because she wants to adopt Amanda's baby boy and not tell anyone about it. In the week of June 29, Jake helped Liza "pretend" to give birth to a healthy baby boy with the help of Tad Martin. The viewers think that Liza has the baby. Then they find out that Jake didn't really give Liza Amanda's baby. Liza names her son after her step-father. He gives her a baby which is put for adoption. Placing Amanda's baby to be given to a family in the country. Until Taylor takes care of him, under the alias Tracy.

Her daughter Colby found out from eavesdropping that Jake Martin was supposed to be her father, but Adam switched the sperm with his. After Trevor went missing, Jake and Amanda can not go to the police because faking the baby's death. Tad followed David and reveal to Liza that she is not raising Amanda's son. Tad and Liza hitched a plan to follow David, and Liza forms a relationship with him. David thinks that Liza's son is his. David learns the truth about the baby being alive. He became extremely furious that this secret was kept from him. He held Liza to gunpoint because he wanted to know where his baby was.

While Liza bonds her "son", the birth mother comes to Pine Valley in search of her baby. Liza initially lies to Bailey and tells her that the baby is better off in his new home. She then is persuaded by Tad to tell the truth about her child being Bailey's son. Rather than Bailey and Liza going to court in a paternity case, Liza invites Bailey to move in with her while she decides if she wants to keep her baby. Stuart's biological father tracks down Bailey in Pine Valley and offers Liza a bribe to keep her baby in exchange for money. She refuses and tells him to leave. Bailey and Damon decide to keep Stuart as their own and move out of Liza's apartment.

In January 2010, Bailey contacts Liza in order to bail Damon out of jail.

On July 6, Damon hugs Liza then ends up kissing her. Right after that Tad Martin, Damon's father walks in with three cans of soda.

Later, on the week of November 29, 2010, David Hayward is shot and critically wounded by Erica; though he survives, he is left comatose. Liza charges Erica with attempted murder, disregarding the fact that Erica only did it to save Ryan's life. Erica subsequently confronts Liza and assures her that, unlike Greenlee, she will not go down without a fight, later becoming convinced that Liza is merely pushing the charges out of jealousy and spite.

On December 17, 2010, Liza became the advocate for David Hayward (who is still in a coma). Slowly realizing that her taking Erica to court is unjustified, Liza finally drops the charges after a discussion with Tad.

References

External links
Liza Colby from soapcentral.com

Colby, Liza
Fictional lawyers
Television characters introduced in 1981
Female characters in television